La Battaglia was an anarchist periodical edited by a group of Italian libertarians in São Paulo, Brazil. First published in 1901, it became a weekly periodical from 1904 onwards, under the direction of Oreste Ristori. In 1912, under the direction of Gigi Damiani, La Battaglia merged with Germinal, edited by Angelo Bandoni and Florentino de Carvalho, giving rise to the periodical La Barricata.

References

Bibliography

1901 establishments in Brazil
1912 disestablishments in Brazil
Anarchist periodicals published in Brazil
Defunct newspapers published in Brazil
Italian-language newspapers
Newspapers established in 1901
Publications disestablished in 1912